Guarenas / Guatire Metro is a combined metro/light rail project of the Caracas Metro to connect the twin cities of the Guarenas-Guatire conurbation and intermediate communities to Caracas, Venezuela.

Overview
The 2 billion dollar project aimed to accommodate 125,000 daily users consists of 2 distinct parts the urban metro line and suburban light rail line.  Construction started on March 18, 2007 with a planned completion projected for late July 2012. The opening date was later changed to 2015 and then to 2016. , there is no official opening date.

Lines 
The metro portion of the project will have the following four stations (part of Line 5):

Miranda/Hugo Chávez (existing station on Line 1; formerly: Parque del Este II)
Montecristo
Boleíta
El Marqués
Warairarepano (transfer station for the light rail portion; formerly: Guaraira Repano)

The light rail portion will have the following stations:

Warairarepano (transfer station for the metro portion; formerly: Guaraira Repano) 
Caucaugüita 
Belén 
Guarenas I
Guarenas II
Guatire I
Guatire II

See also
 IAFE – Venezuelan National Railway

References

External links

Rapid transit in Venezuela
Underground rapid transit in Venezuela
Proposed public transport in South America
Guarenas
Buildings and structures in Miranda (state)